Harpagifer nybelini is a species of ray-finned fish within the family Harpagiferidae. The species is found around Kerguelen Islands at depths up to 64 meters.

References 

Fish described in 2002
Harpagiferidae
Fauna of the Kerguelen Islands
Fish of the Indian Ocean